"Smooth" is a song recorded by American country music duo Florida Georgia Line. It was released as the fourth and final single from the duo's third studio album, Dig Your Roots. The song was written by members Tyler Hubbard and Brian Kelley with Nicolle Galyon and Jordan Schmidt. The duo's fourth headlining concert tour, the Smooth Tour, also takes its title from this song.

Commercial performance
As of November 2017, the song has sold 130,000 copies in the United States.  It was certified Gold on January 12, 2018.

Charts
"Smooth" reached a peak of number 14 on the Billboard Country Airplay chart and number 16 on the Billboard Hot Country Songs chart, becoming their first single to miss the top 10 on either chart. It peaked at number 89 on the Billboard Hot 100, becoming the duo's lowest-charting single on the chart.

Weekly charts

Year-end charts

References

2016 songs
2017 singles
Florida Georgia Line songs
Big Machine Records singles
Songs written by Tyler Hubbard
Songs written by Brian Kelley (musician)
Songs written by Nicolle Galyon
Songs written by Jordan Schmidt
Song recordings produced by Joey Moi